A by-election was held for the New South Wales Legislative Assembly electorate of Murray on 5 August 1872 because of the resignation of Patrick Jennings. William Hay was elected with 61% of the vote.

Dates

Results

				

				
				

Patrick Jennings resigned.

See also
Electoral results for the district of Murray
List of New South Wales state by-elections

References

1872 elections in Australia
New South Wales state by-elections
1870s in New South Wales